Lü Yiwen (also known as Ro Gi-Bun; 1897–1950) was a Chinese diplomat who served as the ambassador of Manchukuo to Nazi Germany, since the German recognition of Manchukuo's independence in 1938. He subsequently took part in negotiating Manchukuo's entry into the Anti-Comintern Pact in 1940.

Lü also served as the Manchukuo ambassador to Finland, a country that also had diplomatic relations with his country. He was accredited on 15 December 1941. In an interview with the Finnish press at the time he gave the estimate that he was the first Manchu to have ever set foot on Finnish soil. He said that although Manchus are not intimately familiar with Finland, they appreciate the country's war feats. When asked about snow and skiing, a popular Finnish pastime, he related that his large home country does get snow, but that in some places it is dry and hard and unsuitable for skiing whereas in other parts skiing is popular.

References

Further reading
Simon Preker: "Illegitimate Representatives: Manchukuo - German Relations and Diplomatic Struggles in Nazi Germany". In: Joanne Miyang Cho (ed.): Sino-German Encounters and Entanglements: Transnational Politics and Culture, 1890–1950. Palgrave Macmillan, Cham 2021, pp. 289–313.

External links

 

1897 births
1950 deaths
Diplomats of Manchukuo